This page disambiguates the Persian name transliterated with the following spellings

 Chuza, Chuzah, Choozeh, Chowzeh or Chuzeh 

as well as the Japanese name transliterated with the following spelling variants

 Chūza, Chuza, Chûza, or Chuuza (中座)

Thus, Chuza may refer to:

Places 
 Chuzah, Khuzestan, a village in Iran
 Chuzah, Qazvin, another village in Iran

People 
 Makoto Chūza, a professional shogi player

See also 
 Joanna, wife of Chuza, the New Testament person